Stadionul Municipal Solovan is a multi-use stadium in Sighetu Marmației, Romania. It is used mostly for football matches and is the home ground of CSM Sighetu Marmației and Plimob Sighetu Marmației. The stadium holds 5,000 people.

References

Football venues in Romania
Buildings and structures in Maramureș County